William Fisher (19 November 1873 – 1910) was a Scottish footballer who played in the Football League for Burton Swifts and Derby County.

References

1873 births
1910 deaths
Scottish footballers
English Football League players
Scottish Football League players
Association football forwards
Kilmarnock F.C. players
Burton Swifts F.C. players
Derby County F.C. players
Bristol Rovers F.C. players
Footballers from North Ayrshire
People from Stevenston